S.I.C. is the first EP by rapper Krizz Kaliko. It was released on May 17, 2011. The album was revealed to be an acronym for Samuel’s Identity Crisis.

Guest artists
The only guest on the album is Tech N9ne.

Commercial performance 
The album debuted at number 41 on the US Top Independent chart.

Track listing

References

2011 EPs